Allen Oldfather Whipple (September 2, 1881 – April 6, 1963) was an American surgeon who is known for the pancreatic cancer operation which bears his name (the Whipple procedure) as well as Whipple's triad.

Whipple was born to missionary parents William Levi Whipple and Mary Louise Whipple (née Allen), in  Izeh, Khūzestān, Iran. He attended Princeton University and received his M.D. from the Columbia University College of Physicians and Surgeons (P&S) in 1908, and was licensed to practice medicine in the state of New York on February 4, 1910 (NY License #10151). He became a professor of surgery at P&S and Columbia-Presbyterian Medical Center where he served from 1921 to 1946. He began work on the procedure for resection of the pancreas (pancreaticoduodenectomy) in 1935 and his original technique has since been modified greatly. In 1940, he shortened the procedure into a one-stage process. During his lifetime, Whipple performed 37 pancreaticoduodenectomies.

He also is known for developing the diagnostic triad for insulinoma known as Whipple's triad.

He supervised the surgical residency of Virginia Apgar, later advising her to pursue her medical career in the field of anaesthesiology because he knew that surgery depended on advancements in this field to progress, and he saw in Apgar the 'energy and ability' to make a significant contribution. Apgar later devised the Apgar Score also at Columbia-Presbyterian Medical Center, by which the health of newborns is evaluated to this day.

Whipple was instrumental in founding the American Board of Surgery. He also was trustee of Princeton University and was a recipient of the 1958 Woodrow Wilson Award.

Though he is not related to George Hoyt Whipple — who named Whipple's disease and discovered Tropheryma whipplei — the two were lifelong friends.

The Science Building at Wooster School in Danbury, Connecticut, is named after Whipple, who served as President of Wooster's Board of Trustees when the school's founder, Rev. Aaron Coburn, died. In the later years of his life he lived in Show Low Arizona.

References

Sources 
Whipple AO. Observations on radical surgery for lesions of the pancreas. Surg Gyn Obst 1946;82:62.
Whipple Website: Allen Oldfather Whipple
The Whipple Procedure, by John A. Chabot, M.D.
Wooster Chronology – Wooster School

American surgeons
Columbia Medical School faculty
Columbia University Vagelos College of Physicians and Surgeons alumni
Princeton University alumni
People from Urmia
1881 births
1963 deaths
American expatriates in Iran
20th-century surgeons